The Tulsa City-County Library (TCCL) is the major public library system in Tulsa County, Oklahoma.

Overview
The library system serves those who live, work, go to school in, own land in, or pay property taxes on land in Tulsa County.  There are 24 branches in the system: Bixby, Broken Arrow, Brookside, Central, Charles Page, Collinsville, Glenpool, Hardesty Regional, Herman & Kate Kaiser, Jenks, Judy Z. Kishner, Kendall-Whittier, Martin Regional, Maxwell Park,  Nathan Hale, Owasso, Peggy V. Helmerich, Pratt, Rudisill Regional, Schusterman-Benson, Skiatook, South Broken Arrow, Suburban Acres, and Zarrow Regional.

TCCL’s collection is composed of more than 1.7 million materials, including books, CDs, DVDs (in regular and Blu-ray formats), magazines, audio books, e-books and other formats.  TCCL offers numerous services to the public including public use pcs and Wi-Fi at each library branch, a bookmobile, homebound delivery, the Ruth G. Hardman Adult Literacy Service, meeting rooms, and reference support via telephone, email, instant messaging, text messaging, Facebook, and Twitter.

TCCL also maintains specialized collections in some of its library branches.  The Rudisill Regional Library houses the African-American Resource Center, the Central Library houses the American Indian Resource Center and the Foundation Center, and the Martin Regional Library houses the Hispanic Resource Center.  Martin and Rudisill also both house the Plan4College Center to provide families and students with information about college.

TCCL was named as a “5 Star Library” by the publication “Library Journal” in their “2009 Index of Public Library Service.”

History
Public library service began in Tulsa County in the early 1900s. The first library was located in the basement of the Tulsa County courthouse. A Carnegie Library Grant for $12,500 was issued in 1904. The grant was raised to $42,500 in 1913 and to $55,000 in 1915. The original Carnegie Library in downtown Tulsa was demolished in 1965.

It wasn’t until the 1960s that what is today known as Tulsa City-County Library was born when, on November 14, 1961, an election was held in Tulsa County to approve “the expenditure of $3.8 million to construct a new Central Library and three branches, plus a 1.9-mill annual levy for funding the system.”  Tulsa voters approved “a countywide system to consolidate metropolitan and suburban libraries the following fiscal year” [Thompson, 115].  The Tulsa City-County Library Commission “officially assumed control of the Library System on July 1, 1962, when the 1.9-mill levy went into effect” [Thompson, 119].  “To be absorbed into the consolidated system were the Broken Arrow Library, founded by the Self Culture Club in 1906 but operated by the city since 1929; the Collinsville Library, created by the Comedy of Errors Club in 1913 and converted into a Carnegie library in 1917; a library in Skiatook opened with WPA funds and operated by the City of Skiatook; and Page Memorial Library of Sand Springs” [Thompson, 121].

By 1963, there were 16 libraries operating within the system [Thompson, 125].  In 1975-76, four new libraries were opened while a fifth was completed: The North Regional Library, the Jenks Library, the Pratt Library, the Skiatook Library, and the Martin Regional Library [Thompson, 154-155].  On August 22, 1978, voters approved State Question 507 to enable an increase in the mill levy [Thompson, 157].  A bond passed on May 12, 1998, that allowed TCCL to expand 11 library branches, replace two, and renovate another eight. Today the system consists of a Central Library, four regional libraries, 19 branches, a genealogy center, a bookmobile and homebound delivery service, and a services center.

Mildred Ladner Thompson, a writer and columnist for the Tulsa World, authored a history of the public library, "Tulsa City-County Library: 1912-1991," released in 1991.

In 2014, TCCL began publishing the Tulsa Book Review, an monthly publication distributed around the city and through the branch libraries. Tulsa Book Review is licensed from City Book Review.

The Central Library of the Tulsa City-County Library became one of six libraries in North America to be honored with the 2019 New Landmark Library designation from Library Journal.

Literary awards
The Tulsa Library Trust, a privately funded public foundation, supports the Tulsa City-County Library.  Among other activities, it gives out multiple literary awards.

Peggy V. Helmerich Distinguished Author Award

The Peggy V. Helmerich Distinguished Author Award has been awarded since 1985 to an "internationally acclaimed" author who has "written a distinguished body of work and made a major contribution to the field of literature and letters."  The Helmerich Award consists of a US$40,000 cash prize and an engraved crystal book.

Past winners of the award are:

2017  Richard Ford
2016  Billy Collins
2015  Rick Atkinson
2014  Ann Patchett
2013  Kazuo Ishiguro
2012  Wendell Berry
2011  Alan Furst 
2010  Ian McEwan
2009  Geraldine Brooks
2008  Michael Chabon
2007  Thomas Keneally
2006  Mark Helprin
2005  John Grisham
2004  not awarded
2003  Shelby Foote
2002  Joyce Carol Oates
2001  William Kennedy
2000  William Manchester
1999  Margaret Atwood
1998  E. L. Doctorow
1997  John Hope Franklin
1996  Neil Simon
1995  David McCullough
1994  Ray Bradbury
1993  Peter Matthiessen
1992  Norman Mailer
1991  Eudora Welty
1990  John le Carré
1989  Saul Bellow
1988  Toni Morrison
1987  John Updike
1986  Larry McMurtry
1985  Norman Cousins

Anne V. Zarrow Award for Young Readers' Literature
The Anne V. Zarrow Award for Young Readers' Literature has been awarded since 1991 to "nationally acclaimed authors who have made a significant contribution to the field of literature for children and young adults."  The award consists of a US$7,500 cash prize and an engraved crystal book.

Winners of the award are:

2017   Laurie Halse Anderson
2016   Gordon Korman
2015   Sharon Draper
2014   Jack Gantos
2013   Jim Murphy
2012  Jacqueline Woodson
2011  Kathryn Lasky
2010  Phyllis Reynolds Naylor
2009  Christopher Paul Curtis
2008  Louis Sachar
2007  Kate DiCamillo
2006  Sharon Creech
2005  Avi
2004  Susan Cooper
2003  Russell Freedman
2002  Richard Peck
2001  E.L. Konigsburg
2000  Jerry Spinelli
1999  Jane Yolen
1998  Cynthia Voigt
1997  Gary Paulsen
1996  Walter Dean Myers
1995  not awarded
1994  Lois Lowry
1993  Katherine Paterson
1992  Madeleine L’Engle
1991  S.E. Hinton

American Indian Festival of Words Writers Award
Inaugurated in 2001, the American Indian Festival of Words Writers Award recognizes literary contributions of outstanding American Indian authors. It is the first and only award given by a public library to honor an American Indian author. The award is given by the Tulsa Library Trust and Tulsa Library's American Indian Resource Center in odd-numbered years. Recipients receive a US$5,000 cash prize and an engraved crystal.

Winners of the award are:

2017 Tim Tingle
2015 Joseph Bruchac
2013 Sterlin Harjo
2011  LeAnne Howe
2009  not awarded
2007  Carter Revard
2005  Leslie Marmon Silko
2003  Vine Deloria, Jr.
2001  Joy Harjo

American Indian Circle of Honor Award
Inaugurated in 2004, the American Indian Circle of Honor Award honors an American Indian for his/her achievements and contributions that have enriched the lives of others. Induction into the Circle of Honor is a celebration of the honoree’s actions in the face of adversity, commitment to the preservation of American Indian culture and legacy for future generations. The award is given by the Tulsa Library Trust and Tulsa Library's American Indian Resource Center in even-numbered years. Recipients receive a US$5,000 cash prize and specially designed trophy.

Past winners of the award are:

2016  Sam Proctor
2014  Ruthe Blalock Jones
2012  Kirke Kickingbird
2010  Billy Mills
2008  Neal McCaleb
2006  Wilma Mankiller
2004  Charles Chibitty

Sankofa Freedom Award
The Sankofa Freedom Award is presented by the Tulsa Library Trust and Tulsa Library's African-American Resource Center. Sankofa is a word from the Akan language, which is spoken in southern Ghana. Literally translated, sankofa means: “We must go back and reclaim our past so we can move forward; so we understand why and how we came to be who we are today.” The Sankofa Freedom Award consists of a US$7,000 cash prize and an engraved medallion. It is awarded in even-numbered years (usually in February during Black History Month) to a nationally acclaimed individual who has dedicated his or her life to educating improving the greater African-American community.

Past winners of the award are:

2016 Tavis Smiley
2014 Susan L. Taylor
2012 Hill Harper
2010 Pearl Cleage
2008 Nikki Giovanni
2006 Michael Eric Dyson

References

Further reading

External links
Tulsa City-County Library
Articles & databases
AskUs!
Books & Reading
Catalog
Event Guide
Tulsa Library Trust official website
Peggy V. Helmerich Distinguished Author Award official website
Thompson, Mildred Ladner. "Tulsa City-County Library: 1912-1991."  Tulsa: Lion & Thorne Publishing, Ltd.

Libraries in Oklahoma
Education in Tulsa County, Oklahoma
1961 establishments in Oklahoma